Mario Pani Darqui (March 29, 1911 – February 23, 1993) was a famous Mexican architect and urbanist. He was one of the most active urbanists under the Mexican Miracle, and gave form to a good part of the urban appearance of Mexico City, with  emblematic buildings (nowadays characteristic of Mexico City), such as the main campus of the UNAM, the Unidad Habitacional Nonoalco-Tlatelolco (following Le Corbusier's urban principles), the Normal School of Teachers (Mexico), the National Conservatory of Music and other big housing projects called multifamiliares. His son Knut is a well-known artist.

Career
Mario Pani was born in Mexico City. He studied architecture in France and Mexico, and later on he would found the National College of Architects (Mexico) in 1946. In 1938, he began the journal Arquitectura Mexico, which was published until 1979.  He  introduced the international style in Mexico, and was the first promoter of big housing Tower block projects. Pani was a great innovator of the urban design of Mexico City, and was involved in the construction of some of its newer parts, developing or participating in the more ambitious and important city-developing plans of the 20th century in Mexico, like Ciudad Satélite (along with Domingo Garcia Ramos and Jose Luis Cuevas), Tlatelolco, the Juárez and Miguel Alemán tower blocks, and the condominium in Paseo de la Reforma, the first of its type in Mexico.

Works 

Pani's works include:
 Hotel Reforma (Paseo de la Reforma at Paris street, Mexico City, 1936)
 Escuela Nacional de Maestros (Mexico City, 1945)
  National Conservatory of Music of Mexico (Mexico City, 1946)
 Hotel Plaza, now Secretariat of Urban Development and Housing
  Secretaria de Recursos Hidráulicos (Mexico City, 1946, currently Embassy Suites)
  Centro Urbano Presidente Alemán (Mexico City, 1949)
  Centro Urbano Presidente Juárez (Mexico City, 1950, more than 50% destroyed after the 1985 earthquake)
  Ciudad Universitaria of the UNAM (1950–1953) based on main plan designed by then student Teodoro Gonzalez de Leon
  Ciudad Satélite (1956–1952)
Insurgentes 300 condiminium (Colonia Roma, Mexico City 1958)
  Torre Insignia (Mexico City, 1962)
  Unidad Habitacional Nonoalco-Tlatelolco (Mexico City, 1964, severely damaged after the 1985 earthquake)
 Port of Entry, Nogales, Sonora 
 Reforma 268 (condominium)
 Condominium on Río Guadalquivir between Paseo de la Reforma and Río Volga, Colonia Cuauhtémoc

Awards 
 1986: National Prize for Arts and Sciences "fine arts"

Tribute 
On March 29, 2018, Google celebrated his 107th birthday with a Google Doodle.

See also
Modernist architecture in Mexico

Gallery

References

Further reading 
 Mario Pani. La construcción de la modernidad/ Miquel Adrià (Ediciones G.Gilli, S.A. de C.V.-CONACULTA, México, 2005)
 La idea del apartamento en México durante el Movimiento Moderno: El proyecto de habitación colectiva en la obra de Carlos Obregón Santacilia, Francisco J. Serrano y Mario Pani. Pérez-Duarte Fernandez, Alejandro (México: PUBLICIA, 2013).

External links
 Youtube.com video: Con los ojos de Mario − Pani I (With Mario Pani's eyes, part I)—

Modernist architects from Mexico
Architecture firms of Mexico
1911 births
1993 deaths
Architects from Mexico City
École des Beaux-Arts alumni
National Autonomous University of Mexico alumni
Mexican people of Italian descent
20th-century Mexican architects